Walkersville is an unincorporated community in Shelby County, in the U.S. state of Missouri.

History
Walkersville had its start in 1839 when a mill was built at the site. A post office called Walkersville was established in 1853, and remained in operation until 1891. The community was named after David O. Walker, proprietor of the early mill.

References

Unincorporated communities in Shelby County, Missouri
Unincorporated communities in Missouri